Bis sa'ani  is an Ancestral Puebloan great house and small house community and archeological site. Located in Chaco Canyon, New Mexico, United States, it contains thirty-five rooms and lies near the south of Escavada Wash  from Pueblo Bonito. While outside the canyon, it is not considered an outlier, but included within the core group of ruins. There are several small house sites in the area, but no great kiva. Bis sa'ani was occupied during the early 11th century.

References

Bibliography

Ancestral Puebloans
Chaco Culture National Historical Park
Archaeological sites in New Mexico